Aleksandar Vasilev may refer to:

 Aleksandar Vasilev (footballer, born 1936), Bulgarian footballer
 Aleksandar Vasilev (Macedonian footballer) (born 1985)
 Aleksandar Vasilev (footballer, born 1995), Bulgarian footballer

See also
Aleksandr Vasilyev (disambiguation)
Alexander Vasilyev (disambiguation)
Alexey Vasilyev (disambiguation)